On the morning of 19 April 2016, Taliban militants attacked a security team responsible for protecting government VIPs in Kabul, Afghanistan. The initial attack killed 64 people and wounded 347. It was their biggest attack on an urban area since 2001.

Bombings
Local broadcaster TOLOnews reported that the attack involved a suicide bomber detonating a vehicle laden with "hundreds of kilograms of explosives" and the militants then making their way into the compound of "Department 10" of the National Directorate of Security (NDS) and opening fire. The bomb that detonated caused a ceiling to collapse in a classroom where elite intelligence officers were being trained. An Afghan security official said members of that unit accounted for about half of the people killed. The local broadcast station said that a two-hour gun battle ensued between the militants and security forces.

Developments 
Sediq Sediqi, a spokesman for the Afghani Interior Ministry, said that despite the target, most of the victims were civilians. Ismail Kawasi, spokesman for the Public Health Ministry, said that 327 wounded have been brought to area hospitals. On 20 April 2016, Sediqi confirmed in a tweet that 64 "innocent Afghans" were killed and 347 wounded.

Afghan Taliban spokesman Zabihullah Mujahid claimed responsibility for the attack. He said as many as 92 security staff and soldiers were killed. It came after the group announced its annual spring offensive Operation Omari.

Reactions

Domestic 
President Ashraf Ghani issued a statement saying that the attack proved that the Taliban were growing weak and therefore resorting to asymmetric warfare. Shortly after the attack, women's rights activist Wazhma Frogh wrote on Twitter that the attacks took place near schools and that parents were attempting to protect their children.

Some parliamentarians strongly condemned President Ashraf Ghani for failing to provide security from the terrorist attacks.

International

Supranational unions 
  NATO: General John W. Nicholson Jr., commander of the Resolute Support Mission, said the attack was a sign of the Taliban's weakness.
  United Nations: the Security Council said that those involved should be brought to justice

Countries 
  India: Prime Minister Narendra Modi tweeted that his condolences and that his prayers were with those affected by the attacks.
  Turkey: Foreign Ministry statemented condemning the attack, they expressed condolences. In addition, they told they supported the Government of Afghanistan for the fight against terrorism.
  United States: White House spokesman Josh Earnest called for the Taliban to cease activities that harmed civilians, and to instead 'pursue a pathway of peace'. The Embassy of the United States, Kabul said the attack underscored the harm the Taliban continued to inflict on the Afghan people.

See also
List of Islamist terrorist attacks
List of terrorist incidents, January–June 2016
 List of terrorist attacks in Kabul

References

2016 murders in Afghanistan
Suicide bombings in 2016
Taliban attacks
Terrorist incidents in Kabul
Terrorist incidents in Afghanistan in 2016
Suicide bombings in Afghanistan
Mass murder in Afghanistan
Mass murder in Kabul
Mass murder in 2016
Military operations of the War in Afghanistan (2001–2021)
2016 in Kabul
April 2016 crimes in Asia
April 2016 events in Afghanistan